National School Choice Week (NSCW) was founded in 2011. NSCW hosts a series of “school choice” events in the last week of January each year.” As an organization it claims to “support the success of America’s children, by raising broad and equal awareness of the traditional public, public charter, public magnet, private, online, and home education options available for children and families.”  However, NSCW has received substantial funding from right-wing foundations and dark money organizations that seek to privatize education and other public institutions.

History
The Gleason Family Foundation, which has a history of funding school privatization groups affiliated with oil billionaire Charles Koch, funded and launched National School Choice Week in 2011. The Foundation has since spent millions in support of NSCW and its school privatization agenda. The Gleason Foundation also has a history of undermining public school teacher protections, as seen in the “Teacher’s Union initiative” they funded at the anti-labor National Right to Work Legal Defense Foundation, where Stefan Gleason served as vice president from 1999-2010.

“School choice” week consists of events in schools, state capitals, and other public meetings featuring the movement's signature yellow scarves. According to the National School Choice Week website, "more than 131,000 NSCW events have been planned across the country" since 2011.

Most events are staged by schools and organizations who support alternatives to public schools, for instance charter schools (which are publicly funded but privately run) and other programs that use public funds to pay for private or religious schools.

National school privatization organizations that have participated in the week's events include the National Alliance for Public Charter Schools, Magnet Schools of America, the Council on American Private Education, the National Coalition for Public School Options, the Home School Legal Defense Association, the American Federation for Children, the Association of American Educators, the Black Alliance for Educational Options, the Children's Scholarship Fund, Choice Media, Education Reform Now, Families Empowered, the Foundation for Excellence in Education, and the 50 State Campaign for Achievement Now.

Right-wing governors and mayors across the country have issued resolutions and proclamations in support of the movement. The list of governors includes Bobby Jindal, John Hickenlooper, Scott Walker, and Martin O'Malley. Well-known mayors such as Marty Walsh and Kevin Johnson have also voiced their support. From 2015 to 2019, the US Senate has passed a commemorative resolution recognizing School Choice Week, and U.S. President Donald J. Trump issued similar proclamations in 2017, 2018, and 2019. In 2018, then U.S. Secretary of Education Betsy DeVos who declared, "I personally think the Department of Education should not exist," spoke at a National School Choice Week event on Capitol Hill.

The President of National School Choice Week is Andrew Campanella. He has served in this capacity since 2012.

About School Choice 
In the 1950s, white parents in the South began to devise and coordinate efforts to remove their children from public schools in order to avoid racial integration following the Supreme Court's ruling in Brown v. Board of Education. While the Supreme Court ruled segregated public schools were inherently unequal, racist white politicians invented tuition vouchers or grants to allow white students to transfer to private “white-only” schools.

The effort by racist Southern politicians, like Governor Orval Faubus of Arkansas, led to entire public school systems shutting down to limit racial integration. After the "Little Rock Nine" enrolled in their local public high school, Faubus shut down all public schools for more than a year to allow private schools to be created for white students to attend, for example.

Some proponents of "school choice" suggest a privatized school system gives parents decision-making power. However, charter and voucher-recipient schools are not required to accept all students, unlike public schools, and have been shown to push out students with less than ideal academic performance.

Additionally, one long-term effect of school privatization that proponents fail to address is the reduction of public school funding and how a lack of funds would weaken universal public education and schools and teachers' ability to meet the needs of students. Also, school privatization weakens workers rights, because most charters and other private schools are not unionized.

References

External links
 

2011 establishments in the United States
Recurring events established in 2011
January observances
Annual events in the United States
Schools in the United States